The Budapest Sun was a general interest, English language newspaper based in Budapest, Hungary. The paper claimed to have the largest circulation of a foreign language newspaper in the country.

History and profile
The Budapest Sun was established in 1993 by Jim Michaels. Much of the staff had come over from the already defunct Budapest Post. It was acquired by Associated Newspapers of Great Britain, a member of the Daily Mail General Trust, in 1996. The paper had a circulation of 16,000 copies in 2002.

The Budapest Sun was closed in early 2009, its last issue appearing on 29 January of that year.

References

1993 establishments in Hungary
2009 disestablishments in Hungary
Defunct newspapers published in Hungary
English-language press in Hungary
Newspapers established in 1993
Newspapers published in Budapest
Publications disestablished in 2009
Weekly newspapers published in Hungary